Live in Paris, Seal's first live album, was recorded at the Olympia Theatre in Paris, France. The 2005 release was a two-disc set, containing an audio CD as well as a DVD which featured a video registration of the entire concert. Among the songs which were performed that night were Seal's hit singles "Killer" (originally written and recorded together with Adamski), "Crazy", and "Kiss from a Rose", as well as "Hey Joe", made famous by Jimi Hendrix. It charted at #88 in Sweden and #44 in France.

Track listing

CD
 "Crazy"
 "Get It Together"
 "Killer"
 "Just Like You Said"
 "Dreaming in Metaphors"
 "Prayer for the Dying"
 "Love's Divine"
 "My Vision"
 "Waiting for You"
 "Kiss from a Rose"
 "Heavenly... (Good Feeling)"
 "Don't Cry"
 "Bring It On"
 "Future Love Paradise"

DVD
 "Crazy"
 "Get It Together"
 "Killer"
 "Just Like You Said"
 "Dreaming in Metaphors"
 "Prayer for the Dying"
 "Don't Make Me Wait"
 "Whirlpool"
 "Love's Divine"
 "My Vision"
 "Waiting for You"
 "Kiss from a Rose"
 "Heavenly... (Good Feeling)"
 "Don't Cry"
 "Bring It On"
 "Future Love Paradise"
 "Hey Joe"
 "Deep Water"

Seal (musician) albums
Albums recorded at the Olympia (Paris)
2005 video albums
Live video albums
2005 live albums
Warner Records live albums
Warner Records video albums